Malcolm Aiken Clark,  (3 October 1905 – 1 December 2002) was Dean of Edinburgh from  1982 to 1985.

He was educated at  the High School of Glasgow and Lichfield Theological College. and   He was ordained Deacon in 1934  and priest in 1935. After a curacy at St John, Greenock he held incumbencies at All Saints Lockerbie, and All Saints, Langholm. During World War II he was a Chaplain in the RAFVR. Afterwards he was Priest in charge at St Mary, Dalkeith and then  Rector of the Good Shepherd, Murrayfield before his time as Dean.

Notes

1905 births
2002 deaths
People educated at the High School of Glasgow
Alumni of Lichfield Theological College
Scottish Episcopalian clergy
Royal Air Force Volunteer Reserve personnel of World War II
Deans of Edinburgh
Fellows of the Society of Antiquaries of Scotland
Royal Air Force chaplains
World War II chaplains
20th-century antiquarians